Łopuchowo  is a village in the administrative district of Gmina Murowana Goślina, within Poznań County, Greater Poland Voivodeship, in west-central Poland. The village lies on the main road and railway line between Poznań and Wągrowiec. It has a population of 350.

Łopuchowo has a small primary school, a chapel, a local league football club and a railway station. It is served by buses and trains running between Poznań and Wągrowiec. There is also a small manor house in the village, built in 1780, currently in a state of disrepair.

References

Villages in Poznań County